Liz Thompson may refer to:

Liz Thompson (politician), Barbadian politician and diplomat
Liz Thompson, character in Soul Eater
Liz Thompson, character in Baby Love (film)

See also
Elizabeth Thompson (disambiguation)